Stephanie Koenig is an American actress and producer. She is best known for her roles as Karen in The Gay and Wondrous Life of Caleb Gallo, Eve in Swedish Dicks, and Sabrina Oznowich in The Flight Attendant. Koenig frequently collaborates on projects with actor Brian Jordan Alvarez.

Koenig is an alumna of Michigan State University.

Career
In 2016, Koenig created the comedy web series, Stupid Idiots, which she wrote, directed, and stars in as Stephanie. In July 2017, Paramount Television and Anonymous Content acquired the rights to the web series. In 2016, Koenig starred in the LGBT themed comedy web series The Gay and Wondrous Life of Caleb Gallo created by frequent collaborator Brian Jordan Alvarez, playing the character Karen.

In July 2019, Koenig joined the upcoming comedy film Sick Girl as Cece. In September 2020, Koenig joined the cast in the upcoming CBS comedy, Wilde Things as Mary Wolfe, which is written and created by Max Mutchnick and David Kohan. In July 2020, Koenig joined the cast of the biographical-drama miniseries, The Offer, which premiered in April 2022. In October 2021, Koenig announced that she wrote, directed, and stars in the satire film A Spy Movie, playing the role Bushilla Strasshola. The film was released online on December 10, 2021.

Filmography

Film

Television

References

External links
 

Living people
20th-century American actresses
21st-century American actresses
American filmmakers
American film actresses
American television actresses
American voice actresses
Michigan State University alumni
Year of birth missing (living people)